Mimomyia (Mimomyia) chamberlaini is a species of zoophilic mosquito belonging to the genus Mimomyia. It is found in Sri Lanka, Philippines, Hainan Island, Celebes, Java Malaya, Thailand, Myanmar, and Australia.

References

External links
Mimomyia Theobald, 1903 - Mosquito Taxonomic Inventory
Pupa of ficalbia (mimomyia) chamberlaini (Ludlow)(Diptera : Culicidae) 1974
Species in tribes Ficalbiini, Hodgesiini and Orthopodomyiini with published illustrations and/or descriptions of eggs (Diptera: Culicidae)
Notes on the feeding and egg-laying habits of Ficalbia (Mimomyia) chamberlaini, Ludlow 1904. (Diptera, Culicidae.).
PHYSICO-CHEMICAL CHARACTERISTICS OF MOSQUITO BREEDING HABITATS IN AN IRRIGATION DEVELOPMENT AREA IN SRI LANKA

chamberlaini